Ken Hermann is a Danish photographer.

Projects 
Hermann's Wrestlers in Mongolia project consists of portraits of wrestlers and ancient Mongolian wrestling matches in the Inner Mongolia.

His Explosion series captures explosions milliseconds after detonation.

He made a series of photographs of street performers on Hollywood Boulevard, many of whom were dressed as famous Hollywood characters.

Flower Men is a series of portraits of people selling flowers in the Malik Ghat Flower Market in Kolkata, India's largest wholesale flower bazaar.

Survivors is a series of portraits of survivors of acid attacks in Bangladesh.

Publications
Im Tal des Omo. Panorama, 2014. .
Flower Men. Heidelberg, Germany: Kehrer, 2017. .

Awards 
2012: Winner, General category, Hasselblad Masters Award
2014: 3rd place, Portraiture, Professional competition, Sony World Photography Awards
2017: Winner, Sports category, PDN Photo Annual

References

External links 

20th-century Danish photographers
Living people
Date of birth missing (living people)
Place of birth missing (living people)
Year of birth missing (living people)